Geophilus  is a large, heterogeneous genus of soil centipedes in the family Geophilidae largely considered to be synonymous with Brachygeophilus. It is a mostly holarctic genus characterized by a claw-shaped ultimate  pretarsus, anterior porefields, complete or nearly complete coxo-pleural sutures at the prosternum, and incomplete chitin-lines. Centipedes in this genus range from 1 cm to 8 cm in length. The generic name first appeared in Brewster's Edinburgh Encyclopaedia in 1814 as Geophilus electricus.

Although centipedes in this genus can have as many as 89 pairs of legs, most species have a much smaller number of leg pairs. For example, two species in this genus include centipedes with only 29 leg pairs, the lowest number found in the family Geophilidae: G. persephones (29 in the only specimen, a male) and G. richardi (29 or 31 in males and 33 in females). This genus also includes several other species with notably few leg pairs, for example, G. pusillus (31 or 33 in males and 35 in females), G. hadesi (33 in both males and females), G. piae (35 in males and 37 in females), and G. bipartitus (35 in males and 39 in females).

Species
The genus contains the following species:

Geophilus admarinus Chamberlin, 1952
Geophilus aenariensis Verhoeff, 1942
Geophilus aetnensis Verhoeff, 1928
Geophilus alaskanus Cook, 1904
Geophilus algarum  Brölemann, 1909
Geophilus alzonis Attems, 1952
Geophilus ampyx Crabill, 1954
Geophilus angustatus Eschscholtz, 1823
Geophilus anonyx Chamberlin, 1941
Geophilus arenarius Meinert, 1870
Geophilus atopodon Chamberlin, 1903
Geophilus aztecus Humbert and Saussure, 1869
Geophilus becki Chamberlin, 1951
Geophilus bipartitus Takakuwa, 1937
Geophilus bluncki Verhoeff, 1928
Geophilus bobolianus Verhoeff, 1928
Geophilus bosniensis Verhoeff, 1895
Geophilus brevicornis Wood, 1862
Geophilus brunneus McNeill, 1887
Geophilus carpophagus Leach, 1814
Geophilus caucasicus Sseliwanoff, 1884
Geophilus cayugae Chamberlin, 1904
Geophilus chalandei Brölemann, 1909
Geophilus challangeri Pocock, 1891
Geophilus claremontus Chamberlin, 1909
Geophilus compactus Attems, 1934
Geophilus crenulatus Silvestri, 1936
Geophilus delotus Chamberlin, 1941
Geophilus dentatus Takakuwa, 1936
Geophilus duponti Silvestri, 1897
Geophilus easoni Arthur et al. 2001
Geophilus elazigus Chamberlin, 1952
Geophilus electricus Linne,1758
Geophilus embius Chamberlin, 1912
Geophilus erzurumensis Chamberlin, 1952
Geophilus eudontus Chamberlin, 1952
Geophilus flavus De Geer, 1778
Geophilus fossularum Verhoeff, 1943
Geophilus fossuliferus Karsch, 1884
Geophilus foveatus McNeill, 1887
Geophilus frigidanus Verhoeff, 1928
Geophilus fruitanus Chamberlin, 1928
Geophilus fucorum Brölemann, 1900
Geophilus gavoyi Chalande, 1910
Geophilus geronimo Chamberlin, 1912
Geophilus gigas Attems, 1951
Geophilus glaber Bollman, 1887
Geophilus glyptus Chamberlin, 1902
Geophilus gracilis Meinert, 1870
Geophilus guanophilus Verhoeff, 1939
Geophilus hadesi Stoev et al. 2015
Geophilus honozus Chamberlin, 1952
Geophilus ibericus Attems, 1952
Geophilus impressus C.L. Koch, 1847
Geophilus indianae McNeill, 1887
Geophilus infossulatus Attems, 1901
Geophilus intermissus Silvestri, 1935
Geophilus joyeuxi Léger and Duboscq, 1903
Geophilus judaicus Verhoeff, 1934
Geophilus kobelti Attems, 1903
Geophilus koreanus Takakuwa, 1936
Geophilus labrofissus Verhoeff, 1938
Geophilus lanius Brölemann, 1896
Geophilus leionyx Chamberlin, 1938
Geophilus lemuricus Verhoeff, 1939
Geophilus longicapillatus Verhoeff, 1937
Geophilus madeirae Latzel, 1895
Geophilus marginatus Lucas, 1849
Geophilus minimus Verhoeff, 1928
Geophilus monoporus Takakuwa, 1934
Geophilus mordax Meinert, 1886
Geophilus multiporus Miyosi, 1955
Geophilus mustiquensis Pocock, 1893
Geophilus nanus Attems, 1952
Geophilus nasintus Chamberlin, 1909
Geophilus naxius Verhoeff, 1901
Geophilus nealotus Chamberlin, 1902
Geophilus nesiotes Attems, 1903
Geophilus nicolanus Chamberlin, 1940
Geophilus occidentalis Linnaeus, 1758
Geophilus okolonae Bollman, 1888
Geophilus oligopus Attems, 1895
Geophilus orae Verhoeff, 1943
Geophilus oregonus Chamberlin, 1941
Geophilus orientalis Seliwanoff, 1881
Geophilus orientis Chamberlin, 1952
Geophilus osquidatum Brölemann, 1909
Geophilus oweni Brölemann, 1887
Geophilus parki Auerbach, 1954
Geophilus pauciporus Machado, 1952
Geophilus pellekanus Attems, 1903
Geophilus persephones Foddai & Minelli, 1999
Geophilus phanus Chamberlin, 1943
Geophilus piae Minelli, 1983
Geophilus piedus Chamberlin, 1930
Geophilus pinivagus Verhoeff, 1928
Geophilus polyporus Takakuwa, 1942
Geophilus procerus C. L. Koch, 1878
Geophilus promontorii Verhoeff, 1928
Geophilus proximus C.L.Koch, 1847
Geophilus punicus Silvestri, 1896
Geophilus pusillifrater Verhoeff, 1898
Geophilus pusillus Meinert, 1870
Geophilus pygmaeus Latzel, 1880
Geophilus pyrenaicus Chalande, 1909
Geophilus readae Jones, 2001
Geophilus regnans Chamberlin, 1904
Geophilus rex Chamberlin, 1912
Geophilus rhomboideus Takakuwa, 1937
Geophilus ribauti Brölemann, 1908
Geophilus richardi Brölemann, 1904
Geophilus ridleyi Pocock, 1890
Geophilus rouncei Jones, 2001
Geophilus secundus Chamberlin, 1912
Geophilus serbicus Stojanović, Mitić, Antić, 2019
Geophilus setiger Bollman, 1887
Geophilus seurati Brölemann, 1924
Geophilus shoshoneus Chamberlin, 1925
Geophilus sibiricus Stuxberg, 1876
Geophilus silesiacus Haase, 1881
Geophilus simoporus Chamberlin, 1952
Geophilus smithi Bollman, 1889
Geophilus sounkyoensis Takakuwa, 1937
Geophilus strictus Latzel, 1880
Geophilus strigosus McNeill, 1887
Geophilus studeri Rothenbühler, 1899
Geophilus tampophor Chamberlin, 1953
Geophilus tenellus L. Koch, 1882
Geophilus tenuiculus C. L. Koch, 1878
Geophilus terranovae Palmén, 1954Geophilus transitus Chamberlin, 1941Geophilus trichopus Muralewicz, 1926Geophilus truncorum Bergsøe and Meinert, 1866Geophilus ungviculatus Daday, 1889Geophilus varians McNeill, 1887Geophilus venezuelae Silvestri, 1897Geophilus vinciguerrae Silvestri, 1895Geophilus virginiensis Bollman, 1889Geophilus vittatus Raffinesque, 1820Geophilus winnetui Attems, 1947Geophilus yavapainus'' Chamberlin, 1941

References

Centipede genera
 
Taxa named by William Elford Leach